Paul Bonifacio Parkinson (born February 16, 1991) is an Italian-Canadian former competitive figure skater who represented Italy in international competition. Parkinson won the 2013 Italian national title and placed 27th at the 2014 Winter Olympics. He retired from competition on March 20, 2014.

Parkinson holds dual Canadian and Italian citizenship. His mother was born in Oratino, Italy. As of March 2014, he planned to study kinesiology at the University of Toronto.

Programs

Competitive highlights

For Italy

For Canada

References

External links 

 
 Paul Bonifacio Parkinson at sport-folio.net
 Paul Bonifacio Parkinson at Tracings

1991 births
Italian male single skaters
Living people
Sportspeople from Ottawa
Figure skaters at the 2014 Winter Olympics
Olympic figure skaters of Italy
Canadian people of Italian descent